Stomatella illusa is a species of sea snail, a marine gastropod mollusk in the family Trochidae, the top snails.

Distribution
This marine species occurs off Norfolk Island, Australia.

References

External links
 To World Register of Marine Species

illusa
Gastropods of Australia
Gastropods described in 1940